The Edith Falls (Aboriginal Jawoyn language: Leliyn) is a series of cascading waterfalls and pools on the Edith River in the Nitmiluk National Park, located approximately  north of Katherine, in the Northern Territory of Australia.

There are trails to the top of the escarpment, allowing visitors to view the waterfalls. Edith Falls is connected to Katherine Gorge via the  Jatbula walk. The traditional custodians of the land surrounding the waterfall are the Jawoyn people.

See also

 List of waterfalls of the Northern Territory

References

External links

Waterfalls of the Northern Territory